Michael Keith "Spark" Clark is a former American football running back who played for one season for the Pittsburgh Steelers 
of the National Football League (NFL). Clark played college football at Akron University for Akron Zips football team.

References

1965 births
Living people
American football running backs
Players of American football from Jackson, Mississippi
Pittsburgh Steelers players
Akron Zips football players
National Football League replacement players